The 1997 European Fencing Championships were held in Gdańsk, Poland. The competition consisted of individual events only.

Medal summary

Men's events

Women's events

Medal table

References 
 Results at the European Fencing Confederation

1997
1997 in fencing
European Fencing Championships
International fencing competitions hosted by Poland